Golden Sisters is an American reality documentary television series on the Oprah Winfrey Network that debuted on June 1, 2013, at 10/9c.

Premise

The series chronicles the lives of three sisters, Mary Bartnicki (age 83), Josie Cavaluzzi (age 73) & Teresa Dahlquist (age 73). The trio became an overnight sensation after their video of them watching and commenting on the Kim Kardashian sex tape went viral. The managing of Josie's salon, giving advice to their fan base and giving their opinions on pop culture are also shown.

Episodes

Specials

References

2010s American reality television series
2013 American television series debuts
2013 American television series endings
English-language television shows
Oprah Winfrey Network original programming